Sphingomonas molluscorum  is a Gram-negative, aerobic and non-motile bacteria from the genus of Sphingomonas which has been isolated from the mollusc Anadara broughtonii in the Peter the Great Bay in Russia.

References

Further reading

External links
Type strain of Sphingomonas molluscorum at BacDive -  the Bacterial Diversity Metadatabase

molluscorum
Bacteria described in 2007